The Soup Investigates is a comedic news television series on E!. It is a spin-off of The Soup. While The Soup reports and makes fun of news events during the previous week, its spinoff follows a group of newspeople who inquire around for news stories that are potentially humorous. Like its parent, The Soup Investigates is hosted by Joel McHale.

The series' pilot episode, featuring comedians Michael Kosta, Sarah Tiana, and Eli Olsberg, aired on June 19, 2013.

Production
On April 22, 2013, E! announced that it was developing the series. It was announced on August 21, 2013, that E! had ordered a six-episode first season, which premiered on October 2, 2013.

Ratings
The Soup Investigates premiered to a 0.3 rating in the Adults 18-49 demographic and 0.61 million viewers.

International broadcast 
The series premiered on E! Australia on November 3, 2013.
Later it was shown on E! Israel

References

External links

 
 

2010s American satirical television series
2010s American television news shows
2013 American television series debuts
2013 American television series endings
English-language television shows
E! original programming
Infotainment
American television spin-offs